
Gmina Świekatowo is a rural gmina (administrative district) in Świecie County, Kuyavian-Pomeranian Voivodeship, in north-central Poland.

Villages
Gmina Świekatowo contains the villages and settlements of Jania Góra, Lipienica, Lubania-Lipiny, Małe Łąkie, Stążki, Świekatowo, Szewno, Tuszyny and Zalesie Królewskie.

Neighbouring gminas
Gmina Świekatowo is bordered by the gminas of Bukowiec, Koronowo, Lniano, Lubiewo and Pruszcz.

References
Polish official population figures 2006

Swiekatowo
Świecie County